Roger Druine (1921–1958) was a French aviator and light aircraft designer. Druine was born in 1921 at Pont-Sainte-Maxence and built his first aircraft age 16. He went on to design a series of small aircraft for amateur construction. Druine died on 19 March 1958 at age 37.

Aircraft

Druine 1938 Monoplane
Druine Aigle
Druine Turbulent
Druine Turbi
Druine Condor

References

1921 births
1958 deaths
Aircraft designers
French aerospace engineers
French aviators